William Annis (13 May 1874 – 1938) was an English footballer, who played in the Football League for Wolverhampton Wanderers.

Career
Annis worked as a machinist before joining the club in August 1898 from Stafford Road (the town's railway works side), making his league debut on 14 March 1899 in a 2–0 win at Bury. He went on to make 147 appearances in total for Wolverhampton Wanderers, scoring one goal. In this period, Wolves' performance in the league was mediocre, but they did win the Birmingham Senior Cup twice during his stay at the club (in 1899 and 1901).

He sustained a knee injury and left the club in 1905 to join nearby Cradley Heath, later moving to Lincoln where he died in 1938.

References
 

1874 births
1938 deaths
People from Darlaston
English footballers
Wolverhampton Wanderers F.C. players
English Football League players
Cradley Heath F.C. players
Stafford Road F.C. players
Association football defenders